The 1993 Norwegian Football Cup was the 88th edition of the Norwegian Football Cup. The 1993 Norwegian Football Cup was won by Bodø/Glimt after they defeated Strømsgodset in the final on 24 October 1993.

Calendar
Below are the dates for each round as given by the official schedule:

First round

|colspan="3" style="background-color:#97DEFF"|11 May 1993

|-
|colspan="3" style="background-color:#97DEFF"|12 May 1993

|}

Second round

|colspan="3" style="background-color:#97DEFF"|25 May 1993

|-
|colspan="3" style="background-color:#97DEFF"|26 May 1993

|-
|colspan="3" style="background-color:#97DEFF"|27 May 1993

|}

Third round

|colspan="3" style="background-color:#97DEFF"|22 June 1993

|-
|colspan="3" style="background-color:#97DEFF"|23 June 1993

|-
|colspan="3" style="background-color:#97DEFF"|24 June 1993

|}

Fourth round

|colspan="3" style="background-color:#97DEFF"|21 July 1993

|-
|colspan="3" style="background-color:#97DEFF"|29 July 1993

|-
|colspan="3" style="background-color:#97DEFF"|Replay: 28 July 1993

|}

Quarter-finals

|colspan="3" style="background-color:#97DEFF"|18 August 1993

|-
|colspan="3" style="background-color:#97DEFF"|25 August 1993

|}

Semi-finals

|colspan="3" style="background-color:#97DEFF"|18 September 1993

|-
|colspan="3" style="background-color:#97DEFF"|19 September 1993

|}

Final

References
http://www.rsssf.no

Norwegian Football Cup seasons
Norway
Football Cup